KF1 is the top level of karting.

See also
 European KF1 Championship

Kart racing events
European KF1